Foeke Kuipers (30 August 1871 – 17 December 1954) was a Dutch architect. His work was part of the architecture event in the art competition at the 1936 Summer Olympics.

References

1871 births
1954 deaths
20th-century Dutch architects
Olympic competitors in art competitions